East Tipperary was a UK Parliament constituency in Ireland, returning one Member of Parliament from 1885 to 1922. Prior to the 1885 general election the area was part of the Tipperary (UK Parliament constituency). From 1922, on the establishment of the Irish Free State, it was not represented in the UK Parliament.

Boundaries

This constituency comprised the eastern part of County Tipperary. In 1918, the boundaries were extended to include those parts of the urban districts of Clonmel and Carrick-on-Suir that had been transferred to South Tipperary from County Waterford as a result of the Local Government (Ireland) Act 1898.

1885–1918: The baronies of Iffa and Offa East and Middlethird, and that part of the barony of Slievardagh not contained within the constituency of Mid Tipperary.

1918–1922: The existing constituency of East Tipperary, together with that part of the existing East Waterford constituency contained in the administrative county of Tipperary.

Members of Parliament

Notes

Elections

Elections in the 1880s

Elections in the 1890s

Elections in the 1900s

Elections in the 1910s

References

Westminster constituencies in County Tipperary (historic)
Dáil constituencies in the Republic of Ireland (historic)
Constituencies of the Parliament of the United Kingdom established in 1885
Constituencies of the Parliament of the United Kingdom disestablished in 1922